The 2018 Formula STCC Nordic season was the sixth season of the single-seater championship supporting the Scandinavian Touring Car Championship. The series uses the previous Formula Renault 1.6 chassis and engines, as it used to go under the name of Formula Renault 1.6 Nordic before Renault Sport dropped its support for the 3.5 and 1.6 classes in late 2015. The season began on 4 May at Ring Knutstorp and concluded on 22 September at Mantorp Park after six double-header rounds.

Drivers and teams

Race calendar and results

The season started on 4 May at Ring Knutstorp and finished on 22 September at Mantorp Park after six double-header rounds. Five of the six rounds supported STCC, the exception being the first Rudskogen round which was co-headlined alongside Porsche Carrera Cup Scandinavia, another STCC supporting series.

Footnotes

Championship standings
Points system
Points are awarded to the top 10 classified finishers. An extra point is awarded for pole position and fastest lap for each race.

Parallel to the main championship, two other championships are held: the Formula STCC Junior Svenskt Mästerskap (JSM) for drivers under 26 years old holding a Swedish driver license, and the Formula STCC Northern European Zone (NEZ) championship at selected rounds. Points to this last championship are awarded using the same system, with the sole exception of pole position and fastest lap not awarding points.

Formula STCC Drivers' Championship

References

External links
 Official website

Formula STCC Nordic
Formula Renault
STCC Nordic